Boycotts of Israel in sports refer to various disqualifications and denial of Israeli athletes. As part of a more or less systematic boycott of Israel, Israeli athletes and teams have been barred from some competitions. In many international competitions, where Israel does take part, such as the Olympic Games, some Arab and Muslim competitors avoid competing against Israelis. Some countries, most notably Iran, even compel their athletes not to compete against Israelis or in Israel.

Contemporary examples
The Israel Football Association was a member of the Asian Football Confederation (AFC) group of FIFA between 1954 and 1974. Because of the Arab League boycott of Israel, several Arab and Muslim states refused to compete against Israel. The political situation culminated in Israel winning the 1958 World Cup qualifying stage for Asia and Africa without playing a single game, forcing FIFA to schedule a playoff between Israel and Wales to ensure the Israeli team did not qualify without playing at least one game (which Wales won). In 1974, Israel was expelled from the AFC group by a resolution initiated by Kuwait, which was adopted by AFC by a vote of 17 to 13 with 6 abstentions. To get around the ban, Israel was admitted as an associated member of the Union of European Football Associations (UEFA) in 1992, and was admitted as a full member of the UEFA group in 1994. Supporters of the Boycott Divestment Sanctions (BDS) movement have advocated for Israel to be expelled or suspended from FIFA, without success. On 24 August 2018, the President of the Palestinian Football Association (PFA) Jibril Rajoub was fined CHF 20,000 (US$20,333) and banned from FIFA matches for a year for inciting hatred and violence against an Argentinian team proposing to play a friendly match in Israel.

The 1976 Chess Olympiad was held in the Israeli city of Haifa, which generated controversy, since several countries, such as the Soviet Union and the Arab nations, did not recognize the state of Israel. As FIDE refused to change the venue, the Soviet team boycotted the tournament in protest, as did all Soviet satellite states in Eastern Europe and FIDE member Arab nations, which held an alternative Chess Olympiad in the Libyan city of Tripoli.

In 2007, Mushir Salem Jawher, a Kenyan-born marathoner, lost his Bahraini citizenship after competing in the Tiberias Marathon in Israel, but later that year reacquired Bahraini citizenship and competed again in the Tiberias Marathon in 2008, 2009 and 2010.

In 2009, there was an increased number of boycotts and boycott campaigns against Israeli athletes over Operation Cast Lead. Israeli tennis star Shahar Peer was denied a visa to participate in a tournament in Dubai, leading to comments from stars like Serena Williams and Andy Roddick that were critical of the Dubai authorities' decision, with Roddick later pulling out of a tournament in Dubai. After a response that included a cable network cancelling its coverage of the event and a large fine for the Dubai Tennis Authorities, the United Arab Emirates did issue a visa for Israeli tennis player Andy Ram to compete that year. Campaigners in New Zealand asked Peer to heed the BDS call and not participate in local NZ tournaments, but Peer publicly dismissed them and the officials welcomed Peer's participation.

Tennis authorities in Malmö, Sweden wanted to cancel a Davis Cup match between Israel and Sweden because of anti-Israel riots and because the city council did not want the Israeli team competing in the city. The tennis authorities were unwilling to accept a Swedish forfeit, which would have eliminated Sweden from the competition, and decided to bar spectators from the match instead (Israel ended up knocking Sweden out of the 2009 tournament with a 3–2 series victory). As a punishment, the city was banned from hosting Davis Cup matches for five years and fined thousands of dollars.

Supporters of the BDS movement also tried and failed to have Israeli teams barred from the 2012 London Olympics and the 2016 Rio Olympics. At the 2016 Rio Olympics, Egypt's Islam El Shehaby provoked outrage after refusing to shake hands with Israeli judoka, Or Sasson.

Despite the country's international political issues, a growing number of Arab athletes are joining domestic Israeli sports teams and the international teams, including the Israel national football team. These include Rifaat Turk, Najwan Ghrayib, Walid Badir, Salim Toama, Abbas Suan, amongst others. Another Arab-Israeli, Johar Abu Lashin, born in Nazareth, was an IBO Welterweight champion.

In October 2017, when an Israeli Tal Flicker won gold in an international judo championship in the United Arab Emirates, officials refused to fly the Israeli flag and play the Israeli national anthem, instead playing the official music of the International Judo Federation (IJF) and flying the IJF's logo. The UAE also banned Israeli athletes from wearing their country's symbols on uniforms, having to wear IJF uniforms. Other contestants such as Gili Cohen received similar treatment. In December 2017, seven Israelis were denied visas by Saudi Arabia to compete in an international chess tournament. In October 2018, the UAE reversed its position allowing the Israeli flag be displayed and anthem played when an Israeli judoka Sagi Muki won a gold medal.

On 24 May 2018, a team of international jurists, including Harvard Professor Alan Dershowitz, announced a plan to petition the international Court of Arbitration for Sport against the exclusion of Israel's flag and anthem at sporting events in Arab countries. In July 2018, the International Judo Federation cancelled two grand slam judo events, in Tunis and Abu Dhabi, because Israeli flags were not allowed to be raised. Also in July 2018, the World Chess Federation said it will ban Tunisia from hosting the international chess competition in 2019 if it does not grant a visa to Israeli contestants, including a seven-year-old Israeli girl champion.

In June 2018, Argentina cancelled a planned football friendly against Israel. The game was originally due to be played in Haifa, but was moved to the Israeli capital city Jerusalem. Palestinians saw this as politicizing the match, as the stadium it was due to be played in sits on the site of a former Palestinian village. Israeli Minister of Culture Miri Regev denied that the game was being politicised by the move, but was being moved to celebrate the 70th anniversary of Israel. International pressure grew on Argentina to call off the game, led by the BDS campaign and the Palestinian Football Association. Threats were also made against Argentine players. The match was called off, with Argentina giving the reason as security concerns. The BDS campaign and Palestinian FA claimed a victory, with campaign group Avaaz thanking Argentina for their "brave ethical decision". Argentine Striker Gonzalo Higuain said they had "finally done the right thing", while Argentine Foreign Minister Jorge Faurie said he believed his country's footballers "were not willing to play the game", but also compared the threats his country's players received as "exceeding of (those of) ISIS." Israel's Defence Minister Avigdor Lieberman responded to the cancellation of the match by calling the BDS campaign "a pack of anti-Semitic terrorist supporters" and claimed that the Argentines couldn't "withstand the pressure of the Israeli-hating inciters". Culture Minister Regev blamed threats on Lionel Messi for the cancellation of the friendly match.

On 18 January 2019, Israel called upon the International Paralympic Committee to move the World Para Swimming Championships scheduled for Malaysia in July 2019 because it has refused to let Israelis participate. 10 days later, the IPC confirmed that due to Malaysia's actions regarding Israeli visas, the championships would be stripped from Malaysia and moved to another location. The IPC board said Malaysia “failed to provide the necessary guarantees that Israeli Para swimmers could participate, free from discrimination, and safely in the Championships”, including full compliance with the IPC protocols related to anthems and flags.

In March 2019, the Israeli national anthem was played in Qatar after Israeli gymnast Alexander Shatilov won the gold medal for the floor exercise during the 2019 FIG Artistic Gymnastics World Cup series. The anthem had previously been played in Abu Dhabi in October 2018, after Israeli judoka Sagi Muki won the gold medal in the Judo Grand Competition.

In August 2019, Iranian judoka Saeid Mollaei refused to withdraw from a match at the 2019 World Judo Championships in Tokyo which would have required, had he won, to compete against an Israeli judoka Sagi Muki in the final. Though he lost, and so did not need to compete against the Israeli, Mollaei feared returning to his country and sought political asylum in Germany. Following the episode, the International Judo Federation (IJF) suspended Iran from competing in any future judo competition. Later on, Egyptian judoka Mohamed Abdelaal refused to shake hands with Israeli Sagi Moki in the same championship. In October 2019, two Iranian teenagers also refused to play Israelis in a chess tournament. On 17 November 2019, the Israeli national anthem was played and Israeli flag flown in Abu Dhabi when 17-year-old Alon Leviev took gold in the junior category at the Ju-jitsu World Championship. In December 2019, Alireza Firouzja, the world's second-highest rated junior chess player, applied to renounce his Iranian citizenship over pressures on Iranian athletes to forego matches with Israeli competitor, the second Iranian sports figure in recent months to do so.

In early November 2019, the BDS movement sought the cancellation of a soccer match between the national teams of Argentina and Uruguay scheduled to be held in Tel Aviv, Israel. The match took place on 19 November.

In November 2020, the International Chess Federation (FIDE) warned the Iranian Chess Federation (ICF) that it could be facing an imminent international ban for its continued refusal to allow Iranian chess players to compete against their Israeli equivalents.

In July 2021, Algerian judo athlete Fethi Nourine withdrew from the 2020 Tokyo Olympics rather than face an Israeli competitor. The International Judo Federation (IJF) temporarily suspending Nourine and his coach.

Individual sporting boycott
Since the 21st century, Israeli athletes competing in tournaments have faced boycotts by athletes from Muslim countries (primarily Iran), speculated to be the result of political interferences.

Iran

Elsewhere

See also
Academic boycott of Israel
Antisemitism in the Olympic Games
Jewish Olympics
Muscular Judaism
Sport policies of the Arab League
Peace and Sport
United Nations Office on Sport for Development and Peace
International Day of Sport for Development and Peace

References

Sport in Israel
Sport in Iran
Sports
Politics and sports
Olympic Games controversies
Sport in the Arab world
International sports boycotts